A Light in the Window may refer to:
 A Light in the Window (novel), a novel by Jan Karon
 A Light in the Window (film), a 1942 Argentine horror thriller film

See also
 Light in the Window, a 1952 short film